The Wilson Chambers Building is a heritage building in Montreal, Quebec, Canada. It is located at the corner of McGill Street and Notre Dame Street West in Old Montreal.

It was designed by Richard C. Windeyer, and constructed from 1868 to 1869 by Charles Wilson. It was renovated in 1990 by Amis Nazar.

It was designated as a National Historic Site of Canada in 1990. It was designated due to its Gothic Revival architecture, which is uncommon on commercial buildings in Canada. The building, which is 5 stories tall, also has both Italianate and Second Empire features.

References

1869 establishments in Quebec
Buildings and structures in Montreal
Buildings and structures on the National Historic Sites of Canada register
Commercial buildings completed in 1869
Gothic Revival architecture in Montreal
National Historic Sites in Quebec
Old Montreal